This is a list of cases reported in volume 303 of United States Reports, decided by the Supreme Court of the United States in 1938.

Justices of the Supreme Court at the time of volume 303 U.S. 

The Supreme Court is established by Article III, Section 1 of the Constitution of the United States, which says: "The judicial Power of the United States, shall be vested in one supreme Court . . .". The size of the Court is not specified; the Constitution leaves it to Congress to set the number of justices. Under the Judiciary Act of 1789 Congress originally fixed the number of justices at six (one chief justice and five associate justices). Since 1789 Congress has varied the size of the Court from six to seven, nine, ten, and back to nine justices (always including one chief justice).

When the cases in volume 303 were decided the Court comprised the following nine members:

Notable Cases in 303 U.S.

Electric Bond and Share Company v. Securities and Exchange Commission
In Electric Bond and Share Company v. Securities and Exchange Commission,  303 U.S. 419 (1938), the Supreme Court ruled in favor of the Securities and Exchange Commission (SEC) in a constitutional dispute between the Electric Bond and Share Company and the SEC over the Public Utility Holding Company Act of 1935. The Act gave the SEC authority to regulate electric companies nationwide, and to enforce its rules.  It required all companies selling gas and electricity in the United States to register with the SEC, and restricted holding companies to one or two tiers of subsidiaries. The Act also gave the SEC the power to limit holding companies to a geographic area so that individual states could regulate them.

Lovell v. City of Griffin
Lovell v. City of Griffin, 303 U.S. 444 (1938), related to the requirement of persons to seek government permission to distribute religious material. The Supreme Court ruled it was not constitutional for a city to require such consent; the city ordinance was unconstitutionally overbroad. Because the ordinance restricted not merely the time, place, or manner of the materials distributed, the Court ruled it violated the First Amendment and, by extension, the Fourteenth Amendment, which guaranteed that the federal constitutional guarantees would be binding on individual states.

New Negro Alliance v. Sanitary Grocery Company
New Negro Alliance v. Sanitary Grocery Company,  303 U.S. 552 (1938), is a landmark decision of the Supreme Court which affects US labor law, safeguarding a right to boycott, and relating to the struggle by African Americans against discriminatory hiring practices. The Court concluded that "peaceful and orderly dissemination of information by those defined as persons interested in a labor dispute concerning 'terms and conditions of employment' in an industry or a plant or a place of business should be lawful".

Hale v. Kentucky
In Hale v. Kentucky,  303 U.S. 613 (1938), the Supreme Court overturned the conviction of an African American man accused of murder, because the lower court of Kentucky had systematically excluded African Americans from serving on the jury in the case.

Federal court system 

Under the Judiciary Act of 1789 the federal court structure at the time comprised District Courts, which had general trial jurisdiction; Circuit Courts, which had mixed trial and appellate (from the US District Courts) jurisdiction; and the United States Supreme Court, which had appellate jurisdiction over the federal District and Circuit courts—and for certain issues over state courts. The Supreme Court also had limited original jurisdiction (i.e., in which cases could be filed directly with the Supreme Court without first having been heard by a lower federal or state court). There were one or more federal District Courts and/or Circuit Courts in each state, territory, or other geographical region.

The Judiciary Act of 1891 created the United States Courts of Appeals and reassigned the jurisdiction of most routine appeals from the district and circuit courts to these appellate courts. The Act created nine new courts that were originally known as the "United States Circuit Courts of Appeals." The new courts had jurisdiction over most appeals of lower court decisions. The Supreme Court could review either legal issues that a court of appeals certified or decisions of court of appeals by writ of certiorari. On January 1, 1912, the effective date of the Judicial Code of 1911, the old Circuit Courts were abolished, with their remaining trial court jurisdiction transferred to the U.S. District Courts.

List of cases in volume 303 U.S. 

[a] Cardozo took no part in the case (Justice Cardozo was seriously ill of heart disease and so missed participating in these cases; he died in July 1938.)
[b] Reed took no part in the case
[c] Hughes took no part in the case
[d] Stone took no part in the case

Notes and references

External links
  Case reports in volume 303 from Library of Congress
  Case reports in volume 303 from Court Listener
  Case reports in volume 303 from the Caselaw Access Project of Harvard Law School
  Case reports in volume 303 from Google Scholar
  Case reports in volume 303 from Justia
  Case reports in volume 303 from Open Jurist
 Website of the United States Supreme Court
 United States Courts website about the Supreme Court
 National Archives, Records of the Supreme Court of the United States
 American Bar Association, How Does the Supreme Court Work?
 The Supreme Court Historical Society